Kathy Galloway is an ordained Church of Scotland minister and was, in 2002 the first woman to be elected leader of the Iona Community. Kathy Galloway has worked for Christian Aid and Church Action on Poverty. Along with John Saxbee and Michael Taylor, is a patron of the Student Christian Movement.

Galloway is also a published poet and hymnwriter – her songs have been widely published in church hymnaries and those published by the Iona Community. She lives in Glasgow.  She has contributed to The Times.

Publications
Imagining the Gospels (SPCK 1987, 1994) 
A Woman's Claim of Right in Scotland: Women, Representation and Politics, ed.(Polygon 1991) 
A Woman's Place: Women and Work, ed. E. Templeton, introductory chapter. (St Andrew Press, 1993) 
Love Burning Deep: Poems and Lyrics (SPCK 1993) 
Struggles to Love: the Spirituality of the Beatitudes (SPCK 1994) 
Getting Personal: Sermons and Meditations(SPCK 1995) 
Pushing the Boat Out: New Poetry (Wild Goose Publications 1995) 
The Pattern of Our Days: Liturgies and Resources for Worship (Wild Goose Publications 1996) 
Talking to the Bones: Poems, Prayers and Meditations (SPCK 1996) 
Dreaming of Eden: Reflections on Christianity and Sexuality ed.(Wild Goose Publications,1997) 
'Put Your Hand in My Side,' chapter in For God's Sake, Unity, ed. Craig, M (Wild Goose Publications, 1998) 
Starting Where We Are: Liberation Theology in Practice (Wild Goose Publications, 1998) 
A Story to Live By (SPCK 1999) 
Praying for the Dawn: a Resource book for the Ministry of Healing, ed. (Wild Goose Publications 2000) 
Walking in Darkness and Light: Sermons and Reflections (St Andrew Press, 2001)
Sharing the Blessing (SPCK 2008)

References

External links
 Biography

Year of birth missing (living people)
Living people
21st-century Ministers of the Church of Scotland
Iona Community members
Leaders of the Iona Community
20th-century births
British women hymnwriters